Northallerton School  is a coeducational secondary school and sixth form located in Northallerton, North Yorkshire, England. The school is located over two sites on Brompton Road and Grammar School Lane.

History

The school was founded in 1322/1323, and in its early history it was known as Northallerton Free School. Parts of the old school building can be seen adjacent to All Saints' Church near the north end of Northallerton High Street. The Grammar School moved to the Grammar School Lane site in 1909.

Selective school
In the 1940s it had around 250 boys and girls, and 450 by 1970. It was administered by the North Riding Education Committee.

In the 1950s there was a two-form entry. The first year forms (unstreamed) were 1A and 1 Alpha, and forms 2 to 5 were streamed (2A/2B to 5A/5B) followed by a Lower Sixth and an Upper Sixth. Admission was by the Eleven plus exam with a further admission of a very small number by transfer from the Allertonshire School at the beginning of the third form. There were two houses for sports, Wensley (green) and Cleveland (blue).

Comprehensive
In 1973 it became a comprehensive under the name Northallerton Grammar School, administered by North Yorkshire, based in Northallerton. As a comprehensive it has always had a 14-18 age range. At the same time the Allertonshire School was formed from the town's two secondary modern schools.

In 1994 the school governors decided to change the name from Grammar School to College in order to  reflect the reality of their service to the whole community. In 2009 the school became federated with Risedale Sports and Community College in Catterick.

In 2015 Northallerton College merged with Allertonshire School to form Northallerton School. The school still operates over both of the former school sites, with the lower school on Brompton Road (the old Allertonshire School site) due to be renovated over two years from 2019 and the senior school and sixth form on Grammar School Lane (the old Northallerton College site).

In 2018, 2 pupils attending the school were arrested for planning to launch an attack on the school. The pair were arrested after the police were informed. In May 2018, the pair were found guilty of conspiracy to murder.

In April 2018, a new headteacher, Chris Drew, was appointed in light of the school being designated as "failing" by Ofsted in an earlier report.  Chris Drew was replaced in September 2019 by Vicki Rahn. Soon after Ms Rahn's appointment, the school secured £8.7 million from the Department of Education to redevelop the old Allertonshire site on Brompton Road, Northallerton. The refurbished site, alongside the newly constructed sixth form centre, opened to students in September 2021.

Academy
Previously a community school administered by North Yorkshire County Council, in September 2019 Northallerton School converted to academy status. The school is now sponsored by the Areté Learning Trust.

Admissions
Northallerton School receives pupils from the town of Northallerton and from a number of primary schools in surrounding villages.

Academic performance
It gets GCSE results above average and A-level results at the England average.

Notable former pupils
 Paul Tonkinson, TV presenter

Northallerton Grammar School
 Robert Allison, Vice-Chancellor and President, Loughborough University
 Thomas Byerley, journalist
 Thomas Burnet, theologian
 George Hickes, theologian
 Alan Hinkes, mountaineer
 John Kettlewell, clergyman
 Dr William Palliser, archbishop of Cashel
 John Radcliffe, physician to William of Orange
 Thomas Rymer, Historiographer Royal

References

External links
 Northallerton School official website

1323 establishments in England
Educational institutions established in the 14th century
Secondary schools in North Yorkshire
Northallerton
Academies in North Yorkshire